Unterdießen is a municipality in the district of Landsberg in Bavaria in Germany. It is located just west of the river Lech.

References

Landsberg (district)